Samuel Ayomide Tinubu (born 28 September 2004) is an English professional footballer who plays as a midfielder for  club Stevenage.

Career
Tinubu started his career at Stevenage, signing a full-time academy scholarship contract in July 2021. He signed his first professional contract with the club on 2 October 2021. Tinubu made his first-team debut in Stevenage's 3–0 away defeat to Oldham Athletic on 16 October 2021, coming on as an 80th-minute substitute in the match. In doing so, he broke Liam Smyth's record (17 years and 37 days) of Stevenage's youngest debutant in the Football League and also became the club's second youngest ever debutant, at the age of 17 years and 18 days old.

Career statistics

References

External links

2004 births
Living people
English footballers
Association football midfielders
Stevenage F.C. players
English Football League players
Black British sportspeople